Carlo Sposito (1 May 1924 – 9 September 1984) was an Italian character actor, sometimes credited as Carletto Sposito.

Born in Palermo, he was among the most active actors in the post-war Italian genre cinema.  He was also pretty active on stage, radio and television.

He died at 60 of myocardial infarction, in Rome. He was the brother of the playwright Faele.

Selected filmography

 For the Love of Mariastella (1946) - Rosalino
 Difficult Years (1948) - Riccardo
 Torna a Napoli (1949) - Vittorio
 Flying Squadron (1949) - Allievo
 Cintura di castità (1950)
 Women Without Names (1950) - Ciulian the Albanian Ice-cream Maker
 His Last Twelve Hours (1950) - Il duca Luca Sorino
 Il monello della strada (1950)
 The Crossroads (1951) - Il vice-commissario Sani
 The Ungrateful Heart (1951) - Anselmo
 The Young Caruso (1951) - Giovanni "Gianni" Palma
 Paris Is Always Paris (1951) - Toto Mancuso
 Una bruna indiavolata! (1951) - Giulio
 His Last Twelve Hours (1951) - Alfredo Bruca
 Falsehood (1952) - Il brigadiere Oriani
 Serenata amara (1952)
 Giovinezza (1952) - Venditore ambulante
 The Piano Tuner Has Arrived (1952)
 Cats and Dogs (1952) - Tonino
 Le marchand de Venise (1953)
 Noi peccatori (1953) - Francesco
 A Husband for Anna (1953) - Nicolino - l'aiuto del fotografo
 Ci troviamo in galleria (1953) - Poppo
 Processo contro ignoti (1954) - Operaio del garage
 Marriage (1954) - Epaminonda Maksimovich Aplombov, il sposo
 Theodora, Slave Empress (1954) - Scarpios
 Papà Pacifico (1954) - Itinerant vendor
 The Three Thieves (1954) - Michele
 Prima di sera (1954) - The Lawyer in Capena
 Milanese in Naples (1954) - Assistente del Prof. Simoni
 The Art of Getting Along (1955) - Il duca di Lanocita
 The Miller's Beautiful Wife (1955) - Pasqualino
 Il falco d'oro (1955) - Baccio
 Songs of Italy (1955)
 Donne, amore e matrimoni (1956) - Oreste
 Cantando sotto le stelle (1956) - Gelsomino
 Serenate per 16 bionde (1957) - Raimondo
 The Love Specialist (1957)
 Primo applauso (1957)
 Serenatella sciuè sciuè (1958) - don Liborio
 Marinai, donne e guai (1958)
 Le cameriere (1959)
 Le sorprese dell'amore (1959) - Gaspare Florio
 Ferdinando I° re di Napoli (1959) - (uncredited)
 La sceriffa (1960) - Gennarino - aka Gen
 Latin Lovers (1965) - L'amico di Fifì (segment "L'irreparabile")
 Con rispetto parlando (1965)
 I complessi (1965) - Massimo Tabusso (segment "Il Complesso della Schiava nubiana") (uncredited)
 Me, Me, Me... and the Others (1966) - Barman
 Ischia operazione amore (1966) - Maresciallo Francesco Capaci
 Don Juan in Sicily (1967) - Scannapieco
 Quando dico che ti amo (1967) - Guiducci - Male nurse
 I zanzaroni (1967) - (segment "Quelli qui partono")
 Un caso di coscienza (1970) - Benito Pozzi
 W le donne (1970) - Galluppi
 La prima notte del dottor Danieli, industriale, col complesso del... giocattolo (1970) - Totò
 Principe coronato cercasi per ricca ereditiera (1970) - Antonio 'Totò' Spampinato della Scaletta
 Le inibizioni del dottor Gaudenzi, vedovo col complesso della buonanima (1971) - Serpieri - the General Manager
 Le belve (1971) - Avv. Apposito (segment "Il caso Apposito")
 When Women Were Called Virgins (1972) - Fra' Mariaccio
 Il fidanzamento (1975) - Totò
 My Sister in Law (1976) - Prosecutor
 The Schoolteacher Goes to Boys' High (1977) - Hauffmann
 The Schoolteacher Goes to Boys' High (1978) - Prof. Morlupo
 La liceale nella classe dei ripetenti (1978) - The Principal
 Cugine mie (1978) - Zio Federico
 The School Teacher in the House (1978) - Colonnello Marullo
 How to Seduce Your Teacher (1979) - Professor Cacioppo
 The Nurse in the Military Madhouse (1979) - Madman
 La ripetente fa l'occhietto al preside (1980) - Don Evaristo

References

External links 
 

Italian male film actors
1924 births
Male actors from Palermo
1984 deaths
Italian male television actors
Italian male stage actors
20th-century Italian male actors